Bogart Creek is a stream in Ray County in the U.S. state of Missouri. It is a tributary of the Fishing River.

Bogart Creek has the name of Alexander Bogart, an early settler.

See also
List of rivers of Missouri

References

Rivers of Ray County, Missouri
Rivers of Missouri